Port 135 may refer to:
 in computing —  Distributed Computing Environment (DCE), a framework and toolkit for developing client/server applications
 in Internet — Remote procedure call (RPC), a communication process that allows for executing a subroutine or procedure in another address space